Lugun is an Indian surname. Notable people with the surname include:

 Amrit Lugun (born 1974), Indian Ambassador
 Anuj Lugun (born 1986), Indian poet and author
 Munmun Lugun (born 1993), Indian footballer

Indian surnames
Hindu surnames